Putri Nusantara (eng: Princess of Indonesian Archipelago) is a beauty pageant from PT. Mahakarya Duta Pesona Indonesia that selected Indonesian representatives in the one of Big Four international beauty pageants, Miss Earth from 2022 also Miss Aesthetic International and Miss Global pageants from 2023. The recent titleholder of Miss Earth Indonesia 2022 is Karina Fariza Ambrosini Basrewan.

Winners

Miss Earth Indonesia
Color key

In 2022, PT Mahakarya Duta Pesona Indonesia get the licence of Miss Earth pageant and appointed the Indonesian representative in the Miss Earth 2022 pageant. In 2023, PT Mahakarya Duta Pesona Indonesia will manage the first Putri Nusantara pageant. One of the selected winner will become Miss Earth Indonesia. Below are the titleholder of Miss Earth Indonesia.

Miss Aesthetic Indonesia
Color key

In 2023, PT Mahakarya Duta Pesona Indonesia will manage the first Putri Nusantara pageant. One of the selected winner will become Miss Aesthetic Indonesia that will represent Indoneia at Miss Aesthetic International pageant.  Miss Aesthetic International focuses on health, anti-aging, also facial and body aestethics. The main purpose of this title is to provide a real impact on the environment through campaigns about healthy lifestyle, stress management, and introduce wellness tourism. Below are the titleholder of Miss Aesthetic Indonesia.

Miss Global Indonesia
Color key

In 2023, PT Mahakarya Duta Pesona Indonesia will manage the first Putri Nusantara pageant. One of the selected winner will become Miss Global Indonesia that will represent Indoneia at Miss Global pageant. Below are the titleholder of Miss Global Indonesia.

Before Putri Nusantara
Color key

Miss Earth Indonesia
Below are the Indonesian representatives to the Miss Earth pageant according to the year in which they participated. The special awards received and their final placements in the aforementioned global beauty competition are also displayed.

See also

Miss Earth
Miss Earth Indonesia
Indonesia at major beauty pageants

References

Beauty pageants in Indonesia
Indonesia